Paul Four (born 13 February 1956) is a French former modern pentathlete who competed at the 1980 Summer Olympics and the 1984 Summer Olympics. At the 1980 Olympics, he placed 12th in the modern pentathlon, with a total of 5196 points.
At the 1984 Olympics, he won a bronze medal in the team event alongside teammates Didier Boube and Joel Bouzou.

References

1956 births
Living people
French male modern pentathletes
Olympic modern pentathletes of France
Modern pentathletes at the 1980 Summer Olympics
Modern pentathletes at the 1984 Summer Olympics
Olympic bronze medalists for France
Olympic medalists in modern pentathlon
People from Katoomba, New South Wales
Medalists at the 1984 Summer Olympics
20th-century French people